Holger Aden (born 25 August 1965) is a German retired professional footballer who played as a forward.

Career statistics

References

External links
 

1965 births
Living people
Footballers from Hamburg
German footballers
Association football forwards
Bundesliga players
2. Bundesliga players
SC Concordia von 1907 players
FC Eintracht Norderstedt 03 players
Altonaer FC von 1893 players
Bayer 04 Leverkusen players
Eintracht Braunschweig players
VfL Bochum players
SV 19 Straelen players